The Enguri is a river in western Georgia.

Enguri may also refer to the Enguri Glacier in Georgia.